Events from the year 1977 in Pakistan.

Incumbents

Federal government 
President: Fazal Ilahi Chaudhry
Prime Minister: Zulfikar Ali Bhutto (until 5 July)
Chief Justice: Muhammad Yaqub Ali (until 22 September), Sheikh Anwarul Haq

Governors 
Governor of Balochistan: Ahmad Yar Khan (until 5 July); Khuda Bakhsh Marri (starting 5 July)
Governor of Khyber Pakhtunkhwa: Naseerullah Babar (until 6 July); Abdul Hakeem Khan (starting 6 July)
Governor of Punjab: Mohammad Abbas Abbasi (until 5 July); Sawar Khan (starting 5 July)
Governor of Sindh: Muhammad Dilawar Khanji (until 6 July); Abdul Kadir Shaikh (starting 6 July)

Events 
 10 January – Nine opposition parties form joint election forum, Pakistan National Alliance (PNA).
 7 March – Zulfikar Ali Bhutto's political party Pakistan Peoples Party (PPP) wins elections. PPP wins 155, PNA 35 seats out of 200. Soon afterwards riots erupt over allegations of vote-rigging by the PPP.
 1 July – Friday is announced weekly holiday, replacing Sunday.
 5 July – Pakistan's army led by General Zia ul-Haq stages a military coup and seizes power. Martial law is enforced and the Constitution suspended.
14 August – Pakistan celebrates 30 years of independence.
 17 September – Zulfikar Ali Bhutto is arrested under martial law orders.
 2 October – General Muhammad Zia ul-Haq bans all opposition; political activities are banned.

Sports

Cricket
 4 March – Colin Croft takes 8-29 against Pakistan at Port of Spain.
 18 February – Test cricket debuts of Colin Croft and Joel Garner vs. Pakistan Bridgetown.
 18 January – Imran Khan takes 12 wickets in a match for Pakistan win at the Sydney Cricket Ground.

Births
1 March – Shahid Afridi, cricketer
5 June – Sayyed Aamir Ali, educationist, writer and columnist
4 December – Shahid Nazir, cricketer

See also
1976 in Pakistan
Other events of 1977
1978 in Pakistan
List of Pakistani films of 1977
Timeline of Pakistani history

References

External links
 Timeline: Pakistan - BBC News
 History of Pakistan over the years

 
Pakistan
Pakistan